The Tai Hon Kong Bo, also known as The Chinese Times, or Da Han Gong Bao, was a Chinese language daily newspaper in Vancouver, British Columbia, Canada. It was established by the Chee Kung Tong in 1906 and ceased publication on 3 October 1992.

However, a research claims that the newspaper Wa-Ying Yat-Po (1906–1909) is not the predecessor of Tai Hon Kong Bo, and that the year of Tai Hon Kong Bo'''s creation is not 1906 but 1910.

On 3 October 1992, Tai Hon Kong Bo announced the suspension of its publication.Tai Hon Kong Bo was the longest-running Chinese diaspora newspaper in Canada, and it acted as the commanding authority for Cantonese-speakers throughout North America.

See also
 The New Republic''

References

Newspapers established in 1906
Publications disestablished in 1992
Chinese-language newspapers published in Canada